William A. Thomas (October 21, 1948 – January 18, 2019) was an American football coach and college athletics administrator. He served as the head football at  Tennessee State University in Nashville, Tennessee from 1984 to 1988 and Texas Southern University in Houston, Texas from 1994 to 2003, compiling a career college football coaching record of 84–78–3. Thomas was also the athletic director at Tennessee State from 1986 to 1994.

Head coaching record

References

1948 births
2019 deaths
American football linebackers
Tennessee State Tigers football coaches
Tennessee State Tigers football players
Tennessee State Tigers and Lady Tigers athletic directors
Texas Southern Tigers football coaches
African-American coaches of American football
African-American players of American football
African-American college athletic directors in the United States
20th-century African-American sportspeople
21st-century African-American people